Mannering Park is a suburb of the Central Coast region of New South Wales, Australia. It is part of the  local government area. It was formerly called Vales Point.

Mannering Park has a public school, tennis courts, open basketball and netball courts, tourist park (BIG4 Lake Macquarie Monterey Tourist Park), two ovals, a number of public access parks, sailing club also known as MPASC (Mannering Park Amateur Sailing Club), sea scout group, and a long lakefront reserve.

The shops in the main street include two takeaway food shops, a cafe, two real estate agents, a post office, a mini-mart (which sells fuel), a hairdresser/beauty therapist, newsagent, pharmacist.

The local industries include Vales Point Power Station and Wyee State Coal Mine.

References

Suburbs of the Central Coast (New South Wales)